"Blind to the Groove" is a song by British group Ultra. It was released in the United Kingdom as a promotional single and as the fifth and final single in Europe for the group's debut studio album, Ultra. The song peaked at number 9 in Spain on 22 May 1999.

Track listing
 CD1 (EW710)
 "Blind to the Groove"  (Edit)  - 3:47
 "Human After All" - 3:31

Charts

Release history

References

1999 singles
1998 songs
Ultra (British band) songs
East West Records singles